Yacine Ait-Slimane (born May 30, 1995) is a Canadian soccer player who plays as a forward.

Club career

Montreal Impact
Ait-Slimane played with the Montreal Impact Academy in the Canadian Soccer League from 2012 to 2015.  He also played in the Premier Development League for Montreal Impact U23.

FC Montreal
On March 13, 2015, it was announced that Ait-Slimane would join FC Montreal, a USL affiliate club of the Montreal Impact for their inaugural season.  He made his professional debut for the club on March 28 in a 2–0 defeat to Toronto FC II.

International career
Ait-Slimane has also represented Canada in the under-18 level.

References

External links
USSF Development Academy bio

1995 births
Living people
Association football forwards
Canadian soccer players
Soccer people from Quebec
People from Saint-Constant, Quebec
People from Sainte-Thérèse, Quebec
Montreal Impact U23 players
FC Montreal players
Concordia Stingers men's soccer players
Canadian Soccer League (1998–present) players
USL League Two players
USL Championship players
Canada men's youth international soccer players
CS Longueuil players